Edwin Sydney Picon-Ackong (born November 4, 1940) is a retired Mauritian football referee. He is known for having refereed one match in the 1986 FIFA World Cup in Mexico between Iraq and Paraguay. Some of the Iraqi team officials and players reacted angrily when Picon-Ackong blew the whistle for half time a few seconds before Iraq striker Ahmed Radhi headed the ball into the goal, meaning that it did not count.

References

Profile

1940 births
Mauritian football referees
FIFA World Cup referees
Living people
1986 FIFA World Cup referees